Giovanni Valetti (22 September 1913 – 28 May 1998) was an Italian professional road racing cyclist. The highlights of his career were his two overall wins in the 1938 and 1939 Giro d'Italia. He also won the 1938 Tour de Suisse.

Major results

1933
 1st Overall Giro del Lazio
1st Stage 3
 5th Overall Gran Piemonte
1936
 5th Overall Giro d'Italia
1937
 2nd Overall Giro d'Italia
1st Stage 3
 3rd Giro di Toscana
1938
 1st  Overall Giro d'Italia
1st  Mountains classification
1st Stages 4a, 7a (ITT) & 15
 1st  Overall Tour de Suisse
1st Stages 3 & 4
 5th Grand Prix des Nations
1939
 1st  Overall Giro d'Italia
1st Stages 6b (ITT), 13 (ITT) & 16
 2nd Giro della Provincia Milano
1940
 10th Giro di Lombardia
1941
 8th Giro di Toscana
1942
 10th Giro del Veneto
1943
 3rd Giro della Provincia Milano

Grand Tour general classification results timeline

References
 

1913 births
1998 deaths
Sportspeople from the Metropolitan City of Turin
Italian male cyclists
Giro d'Italia winners
Tour de Suisse stage winners
Cyclists from Piedmont